Titus Flavius T. f. Sabinus was a Roman eques and the father of the emperor Vespasian.

Sabinus came from Reate in the Sabine region of Italy, the son of Titus Flavius Petro and his wife, Tertulla.  He served as a customs official and then as a banker in the province of Asia, where he was honoured with statues dedicated "To an Honest Tax-gatherer", and later as a banker at Aventicum among the Helvetii in Gaul, where he died.

With his wife Vespasia Polla he had at least two sons, the consul Titus Flavius Sabinus, and Titus Flavius Vespasianus, the future emperor Vespasian; and also a daughter who died in infancy, Flavia Vespasia.

Family tree

Sources

1st-century Romans
Flavii Sabini
Ancient Roman equites
Flavius Sabinus, Titus